Attabad Lake is a lake located in the Gojal region of Hunza Valley in Gilgit−Baltistan, Pakistan. It was created in January 2010 as the result of a major landslide in Attabad. The lake has become one of the biggest tourist attractions in Gilgit−Baltistan, offering activities like boating, jet-skiing, fishing and other recreational activities.

Formation 
The landslide killed twenty people and blocked the flow of the Hunza River for five months. The subdivision of Gojal has the greatest number of flooded buildings, over 170 houses, and 120 shops. The residents also had shortages of food and other items due to the blockage of the Karakoram Highway.

Water levels continued to rise in 18 June 2010 caused by a difference in the outflow and inflow of the new lake. As bad weather continued, the supply of food, medicine and other goods was stopped as all forms of transportation including helicopter service to Hunza could not resume.

Aftermath of landslide

Victims of the landslide and expansion of the lake staged a sit-in protesting the lack of government action and compensation payments to them.

As a result of the damming of Hunza River, five villages north of the barrier were flooded. One village, Ayeenabad, was completely submerged. Major portions of another village, Shishkat, was also submerged. Around 40% of the village of Gulmit, which also serves as the headquarters of Gojal Valley, was also submerged. Significant portions of land in Hussaini and Ghulkin villages of Gojal also got submerged as a result of the surging lake.

The entire population of central Hunza and Gojal valley (Upper Hunza), up to 25,000 individuals, were affected as a result of the lake, due to difficulties of road access and reaching business markets and loss of land, houses, and agricultural products.

Attabad Lake was visited by former Prime Ministers Yousuf Raza Gillani and Nawaz Sharif, and by the Chief Minister of Punjab, Shahbaz Sharif. Sharif announced Rs 100 million of aid for the victims from the Punjab government and Rs 0.5 million for the relatives of those who died in the landslide.

Areas downstream from the lake remained on alert despite some officials believing that a major flood scenario was less likely as the river began flowing over the landslide dam during the first week of June 2010. Many people have been evacuated to 195 relief camps. Two hospitals downstream, the Kashrote Eye Vision Hospital and the Aga Khan Health Service, evacuated both their staff and equipment. Some officials had incorrectly predicted that as soon as the lake began flowing over the landslide dam, an  wave would hit the areas immediately downstream.

As of 14 June 2010, the water level continued to rise. Dawn News reported that "242 houses, 135 shops, four hotels, two schools, four factories, and several hundred acres of agricultural land" had been flooded, and that villagers were receiving food and school fee subsidies. They reported that  of the Karakoram Highway and six bridges were destroyed.

Frontier Works Organization blasted the spillway of the lake first on 27 March 2012 and then on 15 May 2012, lowering the lake's water level by at least .

Karakoram Highway realignment 

Part of Karakoram Highway was submerged due to this landslide. On 14 September 2015, the Prime Minister of Pakistan, Mian Nawaz Sharif, performed the inauguration of the realigned  patch of KKH containing five tunnels at Attabad Barrier Lake. The realignment project is a construction masterpiece completed at the cost of $275 million. The realignment restored the road link between Pakistan and China and it is expected that significant amount of trade will be conducted between China and Pakistan using it. The KKH is also a part of the China Pakistan Economic Corridor and is expected to significantly increase economic integration between those two nations.

See also
 Tangjiashan Lake – formed by a landslide caused by the 2008 Sichuan earthquake in China
 Sarez Lake – formed by a landslide caused by the 1911 Sarez earthquake in Tajikistan
 Red Lake – formed by a landslide caused by the 1838 Vrancea earthquake in Romania
 2010 Pakistan floods
 List of lakes of Pakistan

References

External links
 Landslide Lake on Hunza River Overflows into Spillway – Earth Observatory (NASA)

Lakes of Gilgit-Baltistan
January 2010 events in Pakistan
2010 floods in Asia
Landslides in Pakistan
Government of Yousaf Raza Gillani
Landslide-dammed lakes
Landslides in 2010
2010 disasters in Pakistan